Gloomy Lights is the first full album of the Japanese metal band Gallhammer.

Track listing

Personnel
 Mika Penetrator – vocals, guitars
 Vivian Slaughter – vocals, bass
 Risa Reaper – vocals, drums

References

2004 albums
Gallhammer albums